Shibuya (渋谷区 Shibuya-ku) is a special ward in Tokyo, Japan. As a major commercial and finance center, it houses two of the busiest railway stations in the world, Shinjuku Station (southern half) and Shibuya Station.

As of April 1, 2022, it has an estimated population of 228,906 and a population density of 15,149.30 people per km2 (39,263.4/sq mi). The total area is 15.11 km2 (5.83 sq mi).

The name "Shibuya" is also used to refer to the shopping district which surrounds Shibuya Station. This area is known as one of the fashion centers of Japan, particularly for young people, and as a major nightlife area.

History

Heian to Edo period
Shibuya was historically the site of a castle in which the Shibuya family resided from the 11th century through the Edo period. Following the opening of the Yamanote Line in 1885, Shibuya began to emerge as a railway terminal for southwestern Tokyo and eventually as a major commercial and entertainment center.

Meiji to Showa period
The village of Shibuya was incorporated in 1889 by the merger of the villages of Kami-Shibuya, Naka-Shibuya and Shimo-Shibuya within Minami-Toshima County (Toyotama County from 1896). The village covered the territory of modern-day Shibuya Station area as well as the Hiroo, Daikanyama, Aoyama, and Ebisu areas. Shibuya became a town in 1909. The town of Shibuya merged with the neighboring towns of Sendagaya (which included the modern Sendagaya, Harajuku and Jingumae areas) and Yoyohata (which included the modern Yoyogi and Hatagaya areas) to form Shibuya-ku suburban ward upon being absorbed into Tokyo City in 1932. Shibuya became an urban special ward under the Local Autonomy Act in 1947.

The Tokyu Toyoko Line opened in 1932, making Shibuya a key terminal between Tokyo and Yokohama, and was joined by the forerunner of the Keio Inokashira Line in 1933 and the forerunner of the Tokyo Metro Ginza Line in 1938. One of the best-known stories concerning Shibuya is the story of Hachikō, a dog who waited on his late master at Shibuya Station every day from 1923 to 1935, eventually becoming a national celebrity for his loyalty. A statue of Hachikō was built adjacent to the station, and the surrounding Hachikō Square is now the most popular meeting point in the area.

Post-War Showa

During the occupation of Japan, Yoyogi Park was used as a housing compound for U.S. personnel known as "Washington Heights." The U.S. military left in 1964, and much of the park was repurposed as venues for the 1964 Summer Olympics. The ward itself served as part of the athletics 50 km walk and marathon course during the 1964 games.

Shibuya has achieved great popularity among young people since the late 70s. There are several famous fashion department stores in Shibuya. Shibuya 109 is a major shopping center near Shibuya Station, particularly famous as the origin of the kogal subculture. Called "Ichi-Maru-kyū," which translates as 1–0–9 in Japanese, the name is actually a pun on that of the corporation that owns it — Tōkyū (which sounds like 10–9 in Japanese; this is numerical substitution, a form of goroawase wordplay). The contemporary fashion scene in Shibuya extends northward from Shibuya Station to Harajuku, where youth culture reigns; Omotesandō, the zelkova tree- and fashion brand-lined street; and Sendagaya, Tokyo's apparel design district.

Heisei period
In 1985, Teamer created a new culture in Shibuya.
During the mid 90s, Shibuya also became known as the center of the IT industry in Japan. It was often called "Bit Valley" in English, a pun on both "Bitter Valley", the literal translation of "Shibuya", as well as bit, the computer term for binary digits.

Shibuya Stream, a skyscraper and retail complex, was completed in 2018.

Reiwa period
The East Wing of a mixed-used skyscraper Shibuya Scramble Square was completed in August 2019. Shibuya's new gateway Shibuya Fukuras was completed in October 2019.

2019 New Year's Day vehicle attack

During the early morning of January 1, 2019, a 21-year-old man named Kazuhiro Kusakabe drove his minicar into a crowd of pedestrians celebrating New Year's Day on Takeshita Street. The man claimed his actions were a terrorist attack, and later stated that his intention was to retaliate against the usage of the death penalty for Aum Shinrikyo doomsday cult members. The man attempted to flee but was soon apprehended by authorities in a nearby park.

Miyashita Park has reopened in July 2020 as a shopping complex with a rooftop park.

Geography

Shibuya includes many well-known commercial and residential districts such as Daikanyama, Ebisu, Harajuku, Hiroo, Higashi, Omotesandō, Sendagaya, and Yoyogi.

Districts
 Hatagaya Area:
 Sasazuka, Hatagaya, Honmachi
 Yoyogi Area:
 Uehara, Ōyamachō, Nishihara, Hatsudai, Motoyoyogichō, Tomigaya, Yoyogikamizonochō
 Sendagaya Area:
 Sendagaya, Jingūmae
 Ebisu-Ōmukai Area:
 Kamiyamachō, Jinnan, Udagawachō, Shōtō, Shinsenchō, Maruyamachō, Dōgenzaka, Nanpeidaichō, Sakuragaokachō, Hachiyamachō, Uguisudanichō, Sarugakuchō, Daikan'yamachō, Ebisunishi, Ebisuminami
 Hikawa-Shimbashi Area:
 Shibuya, Higashi, Ebisu, Hiroo

Politics and government
Shibuya is run by a city assembly of 34 elected members. The mayor is Ken Hasebe, an independent.

Elections
 2003 Shibuya mayoral election

The same-sex partnership certificate 
In 2015, as the council passed "Ordinance for Promoting Respect of Gender Equality and Diversity in the Ward", Shibuya Ward became the first Japanese municipality that issues same-sex partnership certificates. According to this ordinance, same-sex couples who live in Shibuya are allowed "to rent apartments together, and have gained hospital visitation rights as family members". The ordinance was intended to bring three benefits to same-sex couples: "(1) rental housing within the ward (co-signing of tenancy agreements for municipal/public housing), (2) medical institutions within the ward (hospital visitation and medical decision-making rights as family members), and (3) employment conditions within the ward (e.g. family benefits, congratulations and condolence leave)". In order to apply for the certificate, couples must be 20-years-old or older residents of Shibuya Ward and have to state that "their relationship is based on love and mutual trust" in a notarized document. Koyuki Higashi (a former member of the Takarazuka Revue) and Hiroko Masuhara (an entrepreneur), a lesbian couple, were the first to receive this certification. Since the Shibuya Ward passed the ordinance, seven other municipalities in Japan have begun offering similar certificates.

The BBC notes that the ordinance has little binding legal force, saying it "amounts to a moral obligation on Shibuya businesses, which will not be penalised if they do not recognise the certificate", though their names will be posted on the ward's website if they violate the ordinance. Shimizu says the system "is not equivalent to marriage, as it does not accord same-sex couples the same rights as heterosexual couples when it comes to inheritance, joint filing of taxes, or social welfare". As it requires at least a hundred thousand yen to apply for the certificate, it can be restrictive to some couples. Shimizu argues that Shibuya Ward has been criticized for pinkwashing as "while passing this ordinance, the administration also moved to expel the homeless in Miyashita Park and other parks in the ward". Pointing out that the mayor of Shibuya Ward in an interview stated that this is not a matter of human rights, but of diversity, Yuri Horie claimed that the term of diversity seems to be used to divide citizens into the good and the bad; it raises only the ones who contribute to the consumeristic society as representer of "diversity of sexuality" while excluding the useless ones. Yuki Tsuchiya, a lesbian activist, also argues that LGBT individuals are used to promote the ward.

Sightseeing and historic sites

Shibuya is famous for its scramble crossing, called Shibuya Crossing. It is located in front of the Shibuya Station Hachikō exit and stops vehicles in all directions to allow pedestrians to inundate the entire intersection. Shibuya Crossing is the "world’s busiest pedestrian crossing", with upwards 3,000 people at a time. The statue of Hachikō, a dog, between the station and the intersection, is a common meeting place and almost always crowded.

On the southwest side of Shibuya station, there is another popular meeting place with a statue called "Moyai". The statue resembles a Moai statue, and it was given to Shibuya by the people of Niijima Island in 1980.

Green areas

Meiji Shrine, Shinto shrine dedicated to the souls of Emperor Meiji and Empress Shōken, surrounded by a 700,000-square-meter forest.
Shinjuku Gyo-en (Sendagaya), former Imperial gardens now open to the public as a park.
Yoyogi Park, once a training base for the Imperial Japanese Army, later the Washington Heights housing area for the Occupation of Japan, then the lodgings for contestants in the Tokyo Olympics.

Buildings

 Shibuya 109, a popular and trendy place for mostly Japanese young women to shop.
United Nations University
 Bunkamura, theatre and concert hall complex
 Cerulean Tower, the tallest building in the Shibuya Station area
 Yebisu Garden Place (Ebisu), site of the former Sapporo Brewery, now featuring restaurants and shopping, along with the Westin Hotel
 National Noh Theatre (Sendagaya)
 New National Theatre (Hatsudai), site of opera, ballet, and other performances
 NHK Broadcasting Center, headquarters of the NHK radio, television, and satellite broadcasting system
 NTT Docomo Yoyogi Building, the fourth-tallest building in Tokyo, patterned after the Empire State Building
 Omotesandō Hills, a shopping mall completed in 2006
 Shibuya Fukuras
 Shibuya Hikarie
 Shibuya Scramble Square
 Shinjuku Southern Terrace (Sendagaya)
 Takashimaya Times Square (Sendagaya), one of the largest department stores in Japan
 Tokyo Metropolitan Gymnasium (Sendagaya), a major indoor arena complex
 Tokyo Baptist Church
 Tokyo Camii, the largest mosque in Japan
 Yoyogi National Gymnasium, designed for the 1964 Olympics by Kenzo Tange.

Streets and places
 Aoyama Dōri, a major east–west thoroughfare
 Center Gai
 Dōgen-zaka, a road in central Shibuya famous for its surrounding nightclubs and love hotels
 Komazawa Dōri – running past Daikanyama, down the hill to Ebisu, crossing Meiji Dōri and up the hill through Higashi and Hiroo. The road stops at the Shuto Expressway in Minami Aoyama. Famed for its beautiful trees that turn bright yellow in autumn, cafes, restaurants, and a large replica of Michelangelo's David outside of the Papas building. Prince Hitachi and Princess Hitachi have their official residence in a palace in large gardens off Komazawadori in Higashi.
 Kōen Street, in central Shibuya between Shibuya Station and Yoyogi Park.
 Meiji Dōri, a major north–south thoroughfare parallel to the Yamanote Line.
 Miyamasu-zaka
 Nonbei-Yokocho, a small street near the rail tracks famous for its small bars and old Tokyo feel.
 Omotesandō, an avenue leading up to the Meiji Shrine with a number of famous-brand boutiques
 Spain-zaka
 Takeshita Street, a shopping street through Harajuku
 Yamanote Street
 Shibuya
 Ebisu
 Harajuku
 Hiroo
 Sendagaya
 Yoyogi

Transportation

Rail

The main station in Shibuya is Shibuya Station. The southern half of Shinjuku Station, including the New South Entrance, is located in Shibuya.
JR East
Yamanote Line: Shinjuku, Yoyogi, Harajuku, Shibuya, Ebisu stations
 Chūō Line (Rapid), Chūō-Sōbu Line: Shinjuku, Yoyogi, Sendagaya stations
Saikyō Line, Shōnan-Shinjuku Line: Shinjuku, Shibuya, Ebisu stations
Tokyo Metro
Ginza Line: Shibuya station
Marunouchi Line: Shinjuku station
Hibiya Line: Ebisu station
Chiyoda Line: Meiji Jingūmae, Yoyogi Kōen, Yoyogi Uehara stations
Hanzōmon Line: Shibuya station
Fukutoshin Line: Shibuya, Meiji Jingūmae, Kitasandō stations
Tokyo Metropolitan Bureau of Transportation 
Toei Shinjuku Line: Shinjuku station
Toei Ōedo Line: Shinjuku, Yoyogi, Kokuritsu Kyogi-jo stations
Tokyu Corporation
Tōyōko Line: Shibuya, Daikanyama stations
Den-en-toshi Line: Shibuya, Ikejiri Ohashi stations
Keio Corporation
Inokashira Line:Shinjuku, Shibuya, Shinsen stations
Keiō Line: Shinjuku, Sasazuka stations
Keiō New Line: Shinjuku, Hatsudai, Hatagaya, Sasazuka stations
Odakyu Electric Railway Odawara Line: Shinjuku, Minami Shinjuku, Sangubashi, Yoyogi Hachiman, Yoyogi Uehara stations
 The Imperial Platform, used by the Japanese Imperial Family on rare occasions, is located along the Yamanote Line, a few minutes walk from Harajuku Station in Sendagaya 3-chome.

Highway
Shuto Expressway
No.3 Shibuya Route (Tanimachi JCT – Yoga)
No.4 Shinjuku Route (Miyakezaka JCT – Takaido)
National highways
Route 20, the Kōshū Kaidō
Route 246, with the local names Aoyama-dōri and Tamagawa-dōri

Economy

Several companies are headquartered in Shibuya.

Calpis, Casio, Mixi, Niwango, Nihon Dempa Kogyo, and Tokyu Corporation have their headquarters in Shibuya. East Japan Railway Company have their headquarters in Yoyogi, Shibuya. 81 Produce has its headquarters in Tomigaya, Shibuya.

Former operations
At one time Smilesoft had its headquarters in the CT Sasazuka Building in Shibuya. In May 1985 the headquarters of Bandai Visual moved to Shibuya. In March 1990 the headquarters moved to Shinjuku.

A.D. Vision - Tokyo, Y.K., the Japanese subsidiary of A.D. Vision, was in Shibuya. Acclaim Entertainment once had its Tokyo office in the Nomora Building. The Japanese subsidiary of Titus Interactive, Titus Japan K.K., had its head office on the eighth floor of the Kotubuki Dogenzaka Building in Dōgenzaka. The former animation studio; Group TAC was also located here.

Square Enix had its headquarters in Yoyogi before moving to Shinjuku ward in 2012.

Companies

Amway Japan: Japan headquarters, a multi-level marketing company
Coca-Cola Japan
Campbells Soup's Japan division is headquartered in Shibuya, on the 10th floor of the Tokyo Tatemono Hiroo Building.
CyberAgent: Internet advertising agency
East Japan Railway Company (JR East)
Gap Japan
Ito En: bottler of tea, coffee, vegetable drinks, and other beverages
NHK (Nippon Hoso Kyokai) (NHK Broadcasting Center)
Papas: clothing, cafe, and bakery company
Sapporo Breweries Limited
Trend Micro Japan: security software company

Education

Colleges and universities 
Aoyama Gakuin University
Bunka Gakuen University (Yoyogi)
Jissen Women's University
Kokugakuin University (Higashi)
Shibuya University Network
Tokai University
United Nations University
University of the Sacred Heart (Hiroo)

Primary and secondary schools
The  operates public elementary and junior high schools, while Tokyo Metropolitan Government Board of Education operates public senior high schools.

 Aoyama Gakuin Elementary, Junior and Senior High School—private co-ed school, in Shibuya, affiliated with Aoyama Gakuin University
 —public co-ed school, in Jingūmae
 The British School in Tokyo Shibuya Campus
 First Commercial High School—public co-ed school, in Daikanyama
 Fujimigaoka Junior and Senior High School—private girls' school, in Sasazuka
 Hiroo Gakuen Junior and Senior High School—private co-ed school, in Hiroo
 Hiroo High School—public co-ed school, in Higashi
 International School of Sacred Heart, in Hiroo
 Jingūmae International Exchange School (JIES), within the Shibuya Ward Jingūmae Elementary School in Omotesando
 Jissen Joshi-Gakuen Elementary, Junior and Senior High School—private girls' school, in Higashi, affiliated with Jissen Women's University
 Kantō Kokusai Senior High School—private co-ed school, in Honchō
 Kokugakuin Senior High School—private co-ed school, in Jingūmae

Public combined elementary and junior high schools
 Shibuya Honmachi Gakuen (渋谷本町学園)

Junior high schools:
 Hachiyama Junior High School (鉢山中学校)
 Harajuku Gaien Junior High School (原宿外苑中学校)
 Hiroo Junior High School (広尾中学校)
 Sasazuka Junior High School (笹塚中学校)
 Shoto Junior High School (松濤中学校)
 Uehara Junior High School (上原中学校)
 Yoyogi Junior High School (代々木中学校)

Elementary schools:
 Hatashiro Elementary School (幡代小学校)
 Hatomori Elementary School (鳩森小学校)
 Hiroo Elementary School (広尾小学校)
 Jingumae Elementary School (神宮前小学校)
 Jinnan Elementary School (神南小学校)
 Kakezuka Elementary School (加計塚小学校)
 Nagayato Elementary School (長谷戸小学校)
 Nakahata Elementary School (中幡小学校)
 Nishihara Elementary School (西原小学校)
 Rinsen Elementary School (臨川小学校)
 Sarugaku Elementary School (猿楽小学校)
 Sasazuka Elementary School (笹塚小学校)
 Sendagaya Elementary School (千駄谷小学校)
 Tokiwamatsu Elementary School (常磐松小学校)
 Tomigaya Elementary School (富谷小学校)
 Uehara Elementary School (上原小学校)
 Yoyogisanya Elementary School (代々木山谷小学校)

Public libraries
Shibuya operates several public libraries, including the Central Library, the Nishihara Library, the Shibuya Library, the Tomigaya Library, the Sasazuka Library, the Honmachi Library, and the Rinsen Library. In addition, the Yoyogi Youth Hall houses the Yoyogi Library Room.

In popular culture
Super GALS! Kotobuki Ran
Tokyo Revengers
Persona 5
The World Ends With You
Neo: The World Ends with You
Jujutsu-kaisen
Alice in Borderland
Hatsune Miku: Colorful Stage!
Tokyo Mirage Sessions

Diplomatic missions

Several countries operate their embassies in Shibuya.

Gallery

See also

 List of leading shopping streets and districts by city
 Shibuya-kei

 similar venues with electronic billboards, jumbotrons and media towers.
 Yonge–Dundas Square, (Toronto)
 Times Square, (New York City)

References

External links

 Shibuya City Official Website 

 
Articles containing video clips
Entertainment districts in Japan
Olympic athletics venues
Venues of the 1964 Summer Olympics
Wards of Tokyo